Lajos Szűcs (13 February 1946 in Cinkota – 2 September 1999 in Miskolc) was a Hungarian weightlifter who competed in the 1972 Summer Olympics and in the 1976 Summer Olympics.

References

1946 births
1999 deaths
Hungarian male weightlifters
Olympic weightlifters of Hungary
Weightlifters at the 1972 Summer Olympics
Weightlifters at the 1976 Summer Olympics
Olympic silver medalists for Hungary
Olympic medalists in weightlifting
Medalists at the 1972 Summer Olympics
Sportspeople from Miskolc
20th-century Hungarian people